Maurice "Mo" Moorman (born July 24, 1945) is a former American college and professional football player.  He played collegiately for Texas A&M, and went to the American Football League's Kansas City Chiefs as a first-round draft choice in 1968.  After winning the American Football League Championship with the Chiefs in 1969, he started for them in their victory over the National Football League Minnesota Vikings in the fourth and last AFL-NFL World Championship Game.  He wore jersey number 76. He threw the key "trap" block on the famous touchdown play in the game, "65 Toss Power Trap."

Following his AFL/NFL career, Moorman returned to his home city of Louisville, Kentucky and started Mo Moorman Distributing Company.  The distributing company featured Coors Light, Zima, Corona, and other imports such as Stella and Dos Equis.  In 2007, Mo sold the company to River City Distributing Company giving River City over 80% of the market share in the city of Louisville.

See also
Other American Football League players

1944 births
Living people
American football offensive guards
Texas A&M Aggies football players
Kansas City Chiefs players
Kentucky Wildcats football players
Players of American football from Louisville, Kentucky
American Football League players